Tibor Ravasz (born 27 September 1990) is a Slovak football defender  of Hungarian ethnicity who currently plays for the Slovak Corgoň Liga club FK DAC 1904 Dunajská Streda.

External links
FK DAC 1904 Dunajská Streda profile

References

1990 births
Living people
Slovak footballers
Association football defenders
FC DAC 1904 Dunajská Streda players
Slovak Super Liga players
Hungarians in Slovakia